Richard Dornbush (born August 27, 1991) is an American former figure skater. He is the 2014 Lombardia Trophy champion, 2010 ISU Junior Grand Prix Final champion, and 2011 U.S. national silver medalist. He competed at the 2011 World Championships and was an alternate for the 2014 Winter Olympics in Sochi, Russia.

Personal life 
Richard Dornbush was born in Corona, California. He has three older sisters. He played the violin for six years. After studying physics at Riverside Community College, he transferred to University of California, San Diego and joined Earl Warren College. As of 2016, he is an undergraduate student in computational physics and intends to pursue a master's degree and a career in finance with a focus on quantitative analysis. His best friend is Katharine McLaughlin.

Career 
Richard Dornbush has been coached by Tammy Gambill since 1997 at Icetown Riverside in Riverside, California.

In the 2008–09 season, Dornbush won gold in both JGP Mexico and JGP South Africa. He qualified for the Junior Grand Prix Final where he took the bronze medal.

In the 2009–10 season, Dornbush won gold at JGP Hungary. He placed 5th in his other event, Germany, but qualified for the Final where he finished 4th. Dornbush was 11th at the 2010 U.S. Nationals.

Dornbush was one of twenty young skaters to receive a scholarship from the Michael Weiss Foundation.

During the 2010–11 season, Dornbush won the Junior Grand Prix Final. At the 2011 U.S. Nationals he placed seventh in the short program and first in the long program to win the silver medal. He was selected to compete at the 2011 World Championships, where he finished 9th.

Dornbush finished 13th at the 2012 U.S. Championships. After Jeremy Abbott withdrew from the 2012 Four Continents, Dornbush was selected to replace him.

Dornbush placed 6th at the 2013 U.S. Championships. He was named as an alternate for the 2013 Four Continents and was called up when Adam Rippon withdrew due to injury.

In the 2014–15 season, Dornbush won gold at his ISU Challenger Series assignment, the 2014 Lombardia Trophy. Turning to the Grand Prix series, he won a bronze medal at the 2014 Cup of China and placed seventh at 2014 Trophée Éric Bompard before capping off the season with a tenth place finish at the 2015 U.S. Championships.

In the 2015–16 season, Dornbush trained with Gambill in Riverside, California, and Jonathan Cassar at IceTown Carlsbad. He finished 6th at the 2015 U.S. International Figure Skating Classic, 7th at the 2015 Cup of China, and 8th at the 2015 NHK Trophy. A herniated disc in his back led to his withdrawal from the 2016 U.S. Championships. According to Dornbush, his back problem is likely not related to jumps.

Programs

Competitive highlights 
GP: Grand Prix; CS: Challenger Series; JGP: Junior Grand Prix

2006–07 to 2015–16

2001–02 to 2005–06

References

External links 

 
 Richard Dornbush at IceNetwork.com

American male single skaters
People from Corona, California
Living people
1991 births